Arthur Dickinson Norcross (1848–1916) was an American musician and politician who served in both branches of the Massachusetts Legislature. He was a first cousin of poet Emily Dickinson.

See also
 130th Massachusetts General Court (1909)

Bibliography
Bridgman, Arthur Milnor:, A Souvenir of Massachusetts Legislators, Vol. XIII, (1904) p. 149.
Cutter, William Richard:, Genealogical and Personal Memoirs Relating to the Families of the State of Massachusetts, Vol. I, (1910) p. 413.
Who's Who in State Politics, 1908, Practical Politics (1908) p. 72.

References

1848 births
1919 deaths
People from Monson, Massachusetts
Republican Party members of the Massachusetts House of Representatives
Massachusetts Agricultural College alumni
Republican Party Massachusetts state senators
Dickinson family